Diphyllodes is a genus of birds-of-paradise. Established by René-Primevère Lesson in 1834, it contains two species: the magnificent bird-of-paradise and Wilson's bird-of-paradise. Both species are endemic to New Guinea, where they are found in forested uplands. The genus is sometimes subsumed into the genus Cicinnurus.

Species

References

 
Bird genera
 
Endemic fauna of New Guinea
Taxa named by René Lesson
Animal subgenera